Loureira Tinta is a rare red wine grape cultivated in Galicia, Spain. It is an authorised variety in the Rías Baixas DOP. Galicia also grows a white variety called Loureira.

Synonyms 
Loureira Tinta is also known under the synonym Loureiro Tinto.

References

Spanish wine
Grape varieties of Spain
Red wine grape varieties
Galicia (Spain)